Operation Starfish was an operation by Australian special forces in World War II on the island of Lombok.

References

Starfish
1945 in Portuguese Timor
Starfish
South West Pacific theatre of World War II